Kim Sang In (born March 25, 1992) is a South Korean model, best known for being a contestant on the fourth cycle of Asia's Next Top Model.

Personal life 
Sang In was born and raised in Seoul, South Korea. She is a notable fashion model and designer in her country. Sang In majored in psychology, before dropping out of school to continue modeling.

Asia's Next Top Model 
Sang In was the only contestant representing South Korea in cycle 4. She made her best composite card as her first best photo. Subsequently, she was appointed as the face of Zalora and Neutrogena after being declared the best performer of the week in episode 6 and 9. She was featured on the editorial of Harper's Bazaar Magazine Singapore edition together with Patricia Gunawan as a collective call-out photos due to tie-scored results. She was declared best performer four times—the most out of all the contestants—and won two challenges. She finished in the top three, losing to Patricia Gunawan of Indonesia as 1st Runner-up and Tawan Kedkong of Thailand as a winner.

Career
Since her appearance on Asia's Next Top Model, Kim has been featured in editorials for Elle, Marie Claire, InStyle, Nylon UK, Dazed & Confused Korea, Vogue Korea and Numéro Tokyo.

She was featured in All Saints Fall 2017 campaign.

References

1992 births
Living people
South Korean female models
Top Model finalists
People from Seoul